Robert Montgomery is the director of the Transplant Institute at NYU Langone Health.

Early life and education
Montgomery was born in January 1960, in Buffalo, New York and spent his early years on Potter Avenue in Orchard Park, New York growing up with his three older brothers and all the kids on the street. The fourth of four male siblings, he decided to pursue a career in medicine after the long illness and death of his father from familial cardiomyopathy at age 52. He received his MD from the University of Rochester School of Medicine in 1987.

Career
Montgomery received his general surgical training at Johns Hopkins Hospital from 1987 to 1995. He was a co-resident with Peter Attia. During his residency, he took time out to complete his D.Phil in Transplantation Biology at the University of Oxford, graduating in 1993. He did a post-doctoral fellowship at Johns Hopkins in Human Genetics. He then finished his clinical training in Multi-Organ Transplantation at Johns Hopkins from 1997-1999 after which he joined the clinical staff as an Assistant Professor of Surgery. In 2003 Montgomery became Chief of the Division of Transplantation and Director of the Comprehensive Transplant Center at Johns Hopkins, positions he held until 2016. In the first year at those positions Montgomery was lead physician in what Johns Hopkins called the world's first simultaneous "triple swap" kidney transplant operation. Other such surgeries with Montgomery as lead physician occurred at Johns Hopkins during the decade. In 2003, Montgomery was the inaugural recipient of the Margery K. and Thomas Pozefsky Professorship in Kidney Transplantation. In 2016, he accepted a position as the inaugural Director of the NYU Langone Transplant Institute in New York.

Montgomery helped develop a laparoscopic method for removing a kidney from a living donor which became common practice.

In September 2021, Montgomery performed the first genetically modified pig kidney xenotransplantation to a human. The kidney was genetically modified by Revivicor, Inc., a subsidiary of United Therapeutics, not to have the alpha-gal sugar. It was transplanted to a deceased human body donor, which did not reject the kidney while ventilated for 54 hours.

Personal life
Montgomery is married to opera singer Denyce Graves.

His favorite Opera is Carmen.

Montgomery has received a transplanted heart.

References 

Living people
Johns Hopkins University faculty
American transplant surgeons
Year of birth missing (living people)